Martin N. Spendiff (24 June 1880 – 18 October 1943) was an English professional footballer who played as a goalkeeper.

Career
Born in North Shields, Spendiff played for South Shields Athletic, North Shields Athletic, Grimsby Town, Hull City, Bradford City and Millwall. For Hull City, he made 104 appearances in the Football League; he also made 11 FA Cup appearances. For Bradford City, he made 54 appearances in the Football League; he also made 3 FA Cup appearances.

Sources

References

1880 births
1943 deaths
English footballers
South Shields F.C. (1889) players
North Shields F.C. players
Grimsby Town F.C. players
Hull City A.F.C. players
Bradford City A.F.C. players
Millwall F.C. players
English Football League players
Association football goalkeepers